Shalom aleichem, Hebrew for "Peace be upon you"
Shalom Aleichem (liturgy)

See also
Shalom (disambiguation)
Sholem Aleichem, writer
As-salamu alaykum